Les Amours de la reine Élisabeth (The Loves of Queen Elizabeth), Les Amours d'Élisabeth, Reine d'Angleterre (The Loves of Elizabeth, Queen of England) or La reine Élisabeth (Queen Elizabeth) is a 1912 feature 4-reel French silent film based on the love affair between Elizabeth I of England and the Earl of Essex.  It was condensed from a play of the same name and directed by Louis Mercanton and Henri Desfontaines. It was shot in Paris and starred Sarah Bernhardt as Elizabeth and Lou Tellegen as Essex. Bernhardt by then was 68 and said of the film "This is my last chance at immortality". She and Tellegen were already romantically involved, and this was their second film together.

Its production company, L’Histrionic Film, was forced into liquidation by Pathé Frères during the film's production, but it was completed with funds from Adolph Zukor. Zukor also brought it to New York City, where it premiered at the Lyceum Theatre on Broadway. The film's US release (on State Rights basis, on 12 July 1912) was the first release from the Famous Players Film Company. Its success convinced other American companies that feature films were commercially viable. Famous Players, which advertised "Famous Players in Famous Plays", later became Famous Players-Lasky, and then Paramount Pictures.

Queen Elizabeth had one of the earliest dedicated film scores, composed by Joseph Carl Breil specifically for the production.

Cast
Sarah Bernhardt as Queen Elizabeth I 
Lou Tellegen as Robert Devereux, Earl of Essex 
Max Maxudian as Charles Howard, 1st Earl of Nottingham  
Nita Romani  as Catherine Carey, Countess of Nottingham
Jean Angelo as Seymour 
Jean Chameroy as Lord Bacon 
Albert Decoeur as Sir Francis Drake 
Georges Deneubourg as Biron 
Marie-Louise Derval as Lady Howard 
Henri Desfontaines 
Guy Favières as Worcester 
Paul Guidé as Shakespeare 
Paul Laurent as Jacques Stuart 
Jane Maylianes as Lady Southwell

See also
The House That Shadows Built (1931 promotional film by Paramount)

References

External links

Queen Elizabeth at SilentEra
Clip from the film at Encyclopædia Britannica

1912 films
1910s historical films
French historical films
French silent feature films
Films set in Tudor England
Films about Elizabeth I
Articles containing video clips
French black-and-white films
Films directed by Henri Desfontaines
Films directed by Louis Mercanton
1910s French films